Yew Wah School of Shanghai is located in the Changning District of Shanghai, China. Founded in 2001, it has been offering international education to Chinese students since 2004. Yew Wah is a licensed Cambridge International Examinations center, offering both IGCSE and A Level courses for high school students.

The school has been growing steadily over the past decade, with an enrollment close to 300 students for the 2012-2013 school year.

External links
 Official Website

Schools in Shanghai
Cambridge schools in China
Changning District